Guehi or Guéhi is a surname. Notable people with this surname include:

 Kouko Guehi (born 1982), Ivorian footballer
 Marc Guéhi (born 2000), English footballer
 Wandou Guehi (born 1967), Ivorian handball player

Surnames of African origin